Comae Berenicids  [sic] (formerly Coma Berenicids, IMO designation: COM; IAU shower number: 20) is a minor meteor shower with a radiant in the constellation Coma Berenices. The shower appears from December 12 to December 23 with the estimated maximum around December 16. The radiant at that time is located at α=175°, δ=+18°.

The Comae Berenicids were first detected within the framework of Harvard Radio Meteor Project. The shower's existence was discovered by Richard Eugene McCrosky and A. Posen in 1959. The Comae Berenicids have an orbit very similar to the December Leo Minorids often leading to confusion between the two meteor showers.

Notes

External links
Comae Berenicids data (IAU Meteor Data Center)

Meteor showers
Coma Berenices
Astronomical objects discovered in 1959
December events 
January events